The former Grohnde Nuclear Power Plant is located in Grohnde in the Hamelin-Pyrmont district in Lower Saxony. It had one reactor that used 193 fuel assemblies and utilized both enriched uranium and MOX fuel. In 1985, 1986, 1987, 1989, 1990 and 1998 the reactor produced more net electricity for the respective year than any other reactor in the world.

The plant was of the pressurized water reactor type, using four water based coolant cycles, kept under high pressure.

In 2021 the plan passed the mark of 400 TWh total low-carbon electricity output since it was connected to the grid.

The plant was decommissioned on 31 December 2021 as part of Germany's transition to a renewable energy future.

References

Former nuclear power stations in Germany
Economy of Lower Saxony